The 2015–16 Women's FA Cup was the 46th staging of the FA Women's Cup, a knockout cup competition for women's football teams in England. Chelsea were the defending champions, having beaten Notts County 1–0 in the previous final. Arsenal were crowned champions, beating Chelsea 1–0.

Format
The level of league football played by each team determined the stage of the competition in which they were inserted.

There were 262 entries this year and four qualifying round were played.

Entry points:
WSL 1 teams: Fifth round
WSL 2 teams: Third round
Premier League national: Second round
Premier League Regional: Third round qualifying

First round qualifying

Notes

Second round qualifying

Third qualifying round

Fourth qualifying round
Drawn on 12 October. Ties played on 8 November. Ties 6,7,10,18 & 22 were postponed until 15 November. 
As Nettleham were unable to fulfil the fixture, Leicester City Women received a walkover. Tie 6 was postponed further until 22 November.

First Round Proper
The draw was held on 9 November 2015. Ties were played on 6 December. Ties 1,2 & 11 were postponed until 13 December.

Second Round Proper
All matches were played in January 2016.

Third Round Proper
All matches were played in February 2016.

Fourth Round Proper
Ties were played on 28 February 2016. Brighton & Hove Albion initially won 2–1, but were forced to replay their game, as they named too many substitutes (7 instead of 5) on the match form. The tie was replayed on 13 March.

Fifth Round Proper
Seven winners of the previous round were joined by the nine WSL 1 teams. Matches were played on 19 and 20 March 2016.

Quarter-finals
Sporting Club Albion were the only team from outside the FA WSL to reach the quarter-finals. Matches were played on 3 April 2016.

Semi-finals
Matches were played on Sunday 17 April 2016.

Final

References

External links
theFA.com
Cup season at soccerway.com

Women's FA Cup seasons
Cup